Perestroika was a political movement for reform within the Communist Party of the Soviet Union (CPSU) during the late 1980s widely associated with CPSU general secretary Mikhail Gorbachev and his glasnost (meaning "openness") policy reform. The literal meaning of perestroika is "reconstruction", referring to the restructuring of the Soviet political and economic system, in an attempt to end the Era of Stagnation.

Perestroika allowed more independent actions from various ministries and introduced many market-like reforms. The alleged goal of perestroika, however, was not to end the command economy but rather to make socialism work more efficiently to better meet the needs of Soviet citizens by adopting elements of liberal economics. The process of implementing perestroika added to existing shortages, and created political, social, and economic tensions within the Soviet Union. Furthermore, it is often blamed for the political ascent of nationalism and nationalist political parties in the constituent republics.

Gorbachev first used the term in a speech during his visit to the City of Togliatti in 1986. Perestroika lasted from 1985 until 1991, and is often argued to be a significant cause of the collapse of the Eastern Bloc and the dissolution of the Soviet Union. This marked the end of the Cold War.

Economic reforms
In May 1985, Gorbachev gave a speech in Leningrad (now Saint Petersburg) in which he admitted the slowing of economic development, and inadequate living standards.

The program was furthered at the 27th Congress of the Communist Party in Gorbachev's report to the congress, in which he spoke about "perestroika", "uskoreniye", "human factor", "glasnost", and "expansion of the khozraschyot" (commercialization).

During the initial period (1985–87) of Mikhail Gorbachev's time in power, he talked about modifying central planning but did not make any truly fundamental changes (uskoreniye; "acceleration"). Gorbachev and his team of economic advisors then introduced more fundamental reforms, which became known as perestroika (restructuring).

At the June 1987 plenary session of the Central Committee of the Communist Party of the Soviet Union, Gorbachev presented his "basic theses", which laid the political foundation of economic reform for the remainder of the existence of the Soviet Union.

In July 1987, the Supreme Soviet of the Soviet Union passed the Law on State Enterprise. The law stipulated that state enterprises were free to determine output levels based on demand from consumers and other enterprises. Enterprises had to fulfill state orders, but they could dispose of the remaining output as they saw fit. However, at the same time the state still held control over the means of production for these enterprises, thus limiting their ability to enact full-cost accountability. Enterprises bought input from suppliers at negotiated contract prices. Under the law, enterprises became self-financing; that is, they had to cover expenses (wages, taxes, supplies, and debt service) through revenues. No longer was the government to rescue unprofitable enterprises that could face bankruptcy. Finally, the law shifted control over the enterprise operations from ministries to elected workers' collectives. Gosplan's responsibilities were to supply general guidelines and national investment priorities, not to formulate detailed production plans.

The Law on Cooperatives, enacted in May 1988, was perhaps the most radical of the economic reforms during the early part of the Gorbachev era. For the first time since Vladimir Lenin's New Economic Policy was abolished in 1928, the law permitted collective ownership of businesses in the services, manufacturing, and foreign-trade sectors. The law initially imposed high taxes and employment restrictions, but it later revised these to avoid discouraging private-sector activity. Under this provision, cooperative restaurants, shops, and manufacturers became part of the Soviet scene.

Gorbachev brought perestroika to the Soviet Union's foreign economic sector with measures that Soviet economists considered bold at that time. His program virtually eliminated the monopoly that the Ministry of Foreign Trade had once held on most trade operations. It permitted the ministries of the various industrial and agricultural branches to conduct foreign trade in sectors under their responsibility, rather than having to operate indirectly through the bureaucracy of trade ministry organizations. In addition, regional and local organizations and individual state enterprises were permitted to conduct foreign trade. This change was an attempt to redress a major imperfection in the Soviet foreign trade regime: the lack of contact between Soviet end users and suppliers and their foreign partners.

Alexander Yakovlev was considered to be the intellectual force behind Gorbachev's reform program of glasnost and perestroika. In the summer of 1985, Yakovlev became head of the propaganda department of the CPSU Central Committee. He argued in favor of the reform programs and played a key role in executing those policies.

The most significant of Gorbachev's reforms in the foreign economic sector allowed foreigners to invest in the Soviet Union in the form of joint ventures with Soviet ministries, state enterprises, and cooperatives. The original version of the Soviet Joint Venture Law, which went into effect in June 1987, limited foreign shares of a Soviet venture to 49 percent and required that Soviet citizens occupy the positions of chairman and general manager. After potential Western partners complained, the government revised the regulations to allow majority foreign ownership and control. Under the terms of the Joint Venture Law, the Soviet partner supplied labor, infrastructure, and a potentially large domestic market. The foreign partner supplied capital, technology, entrepreneurial expertise, and in many cases, products and services of world competitive quality.

Gorbachev's economic changes did not do much to restart the country's sluggish economy in the late 1980s. The reforms decentralized things to some extent, although price controls remained, as did the ruble's inconvertibility and most government controls over the means of production.

Comparison with China
Perestroika and Deng Xiaoping's economic reforms have similar origins but very different effects on their respective countries' economies. Both efforts occurred in large socialist countries attempting to liberalize their economies, but while China's GDP has grown consistently since the late 1980s (albeit from a much lower level), national GDP in the USSR and in many of its successor states fell precipitously throughout the 1990s. Gorbachev's reforms were gradualist and maintained many of the macroeconomic aspects of the command economy (including price controls, inconvertibility of the ruble, exclusion of private property ownership, and the government monopoly over most means of production).

Reform was largely focused on industry and on cooperatives, and a limited role was given to the development of foreign investment and international trade. Factory managers were expected to meet state demands for goods, but to find their own funding. Perestroika reforms went far enough to create new bottlenecks in the Soviet economy but arguably did not go far enough to effectively streamline it.

Chinese economic reform was, by contrast, a bottom-up attempt at reform, focusing on light industry and agriculture (namely allowing peasants to sell produce grown on private holdings at market prices). Economic reforms were fostered through the development of "Special Economic Zones", designed for export and to attract foreign investment, municipally managed Township and Village Enterprises and a "dual pricing" system leading to the steady phasing out of state-dictated prices. Greater latitude was given to managers of state-owned factories, while capital was made available to them through a reformed banking system and through fiscal policies (in contrast to the fiscal anarchy and fall in revenue experienced by the Soviet government during perestroika). Perestroika was expected to lead to results such as market pricing and privately sold produce, but the Union dissolved before advanced stages were reached.

Another fundamental difference is that where perestroika was accompanied by greater political freedoms under Gorbachev's glasnost policies, Chinese economic reform has been accompanied by continued authoritarian rule and a suppression of political dissidents, most notably at Tiananmen Square. Gorbachev acknowledges this difference but has always maintained that it was unavoidable and that perestroika would have been doomed to defeat and revanchism by the nomenklatura without glasnost, because conditions in the Soviet Union were not identical to those in China. Gorbachev had lived through the era in which the attempted reforms by Khrushchev, limited as they were, were rolled back under Brezhnev and other pro-totalitarian conservatives, and he could clearly see that the same could happen again without glasnost to allow broad oppositional pressure against the nomenklatura. Gorbachev cited a line from a 1986 newspaper article that he felt encapsulated this reality: "The apparatus broke Khrushchev's neck and the same thing will happen now."

Another difference is that Soviet Union faced strong secession threats from its ethnic regions and a primacy challenge by the RSFSR. Gorbachev's extension of regional autonomy removed the suppression from existing ethnic-regional tension, while Deng's reforms did not alter the tight grip of the central government on any of their autonomous regions. The Soviet Union's dual nature, part supranational union of republics and part unitary state, played a part in the difficulty of controlling the pace of restructuring, especially once the new Russian Communist Party was formed and posed a challenge to the primacy of the CPSU. Gorbachev described this process as a "parade of sovereignties" and identified it as the factor that most undermined the gradualism of restructuring and the preservation of the Soviet Union.

Perestroika and glasnost

One of the final important measures taken on the continuation of the movement was a report from the central committee meeting of the CPSU titled "On Reorganization and the Party's Personnel Policy". Gorbachev emphasized the need of a faster political personnel turnover and of a policy of democratization that opened the political elections to multiple candidates and to non-party members.

This report was in such high demand in Prague and Berlin that many people could not get a copy. One effect was the abrupt demand for Russian dictionaries in order to understand the content of Gorbachev's report. 

The biggest weapon used during Perestroika was Glasnost as a Political Weapon. For the previous fifty years, the USSR was a bureaucracy that needed restructuring and Gorbachev saw it needed to shift towards conservative. It was said that the theory of glasnost is perceived as being Leninist, in reference to Leninist socialism. In an interview with Miezeslaw Rakowski he states the success of perestroika was impossible without glasnost.

The role of the West in Perestroika 

During the 1980s and 1990s the United States President George H. W. Bush pledged solidarity with Gorbachev, but never brought his administration into supporting Gorbachev's reform. In fact, "no bailout for Gorbachev" was a consistent policy line of the Bush Administration, further demonstrating the lack of true support from the West. President Bush had a financial policy to aid perestroika that was shaped by a minimalist approach, foreign-policy convictions that set Bush up against other U.S. internal affairs, and a frugal attitude, all influencing his unwillingness to aid Gorbachev. Other factors influenced the West's lack of aid as well like "the in-house Gorbi-skeptics" advocacy, the expert community's consensus about the undesirability of rushing U.S. aid to Gorbachev, and strong opposition to any bailout at many levels, including foreign-policy conservatives, the U.S. Congress, and the American public at large. The West seemed to miss an opportunity to gain significant influence over the Soviet regime. The Soviets aided in the expansion of Western capitalism to allow for an inflow of Western investments, but the perestroika managers failed. President Bush had the opportunity to aid the Soviet Union in a way to bring closer ties between the governments, like Harry S. Truman did for many nations in Western Europe. Early on, as perestroika was getting under way, I felt like the West might come along and find it a sensible thing to do—easing Russia's difficult transition from totalitarianism to democracy. What I had in mind in the first place, was the participation [of the West] in conversion of defense industries, the modernization of light and food industries, and Russia's inclusion on an equal-member footing in the frameworks of the international economic relations... [U]nlike some democrats, I did not expect "manna from Heaven," but counted on the Western statesmen to use their common sense.President George H.W. Bush continued to dodge helping the Russians and the President of Czechoslovakia, Václav Havel, laid bare the linkage for the Americans in his address to a joint session of Congress on 21 February 1990: ... I often hear the question: How can the United States of America help us today? My reply is as paradoxical as the whole of my life has been: You can help us most of all if you help the Soviet Union on its irreversible, but immensely complicated road to democracy....[T]he sooner, the more quickly, and the more peacefully the Soviet Union begins to move along the road toward genuine political pluralism, respect for the rights of nations to their own integrity and to a working—that is a market—economy, the better it will be, not just for Czechs and Slovaks, but for the whole world.

When the United States needed help with Germany's reunification, Gorbachev proved to be instrumental in bringing solutions to the "German problem" and Bush acknowledged that "Gorbachev was moving the USSR in the right direction". Bush, in his own words, even gave praise to Gorbachev "to salute the man" in acknowledgment of the Soviet leader's role as "the architect of perestroika... [who had] conducted the affairs of the Soviet Union with great restraint as Poland and Czechoslovakia and GDR... and other countries [that had] achieved their independence", and who was "under extraordinary pressure at home, particularly on the economy."

References

Further reading

External links

 Mikhail Gorbachev on perestroika
 Chris Harman & Andy Zebrowski. Glasnost – before the storm (Summer 1988)
 Yakovlev on perestroika
 The Economic Collapse of the Soviet Union
 Perestroika – TM in Ukraine
The Decline of the Soviet Union: A Hypothesis on Industrial Paradigms, Technological Revolutions and the Roots of Perestroika by Angelo Segrillo

 
1980s economic history
Soviet phraseology
Economy of the Soviet Union
Soviet internal politics
Dissolution of the Soviet Union
1980s in the Soviet Union
1980s in politics
Mikhail Gorbachev
Political catchphrases
Reform in the Soviet Union
Russian words and phrases